Estoy por ti is a television dating show broadcast on Spain's Antena 3 channel from 11 July 2005 to 2006. It was presented by actress Anabel Alonso, and later by the Argentine Michel Brown.

References

External links
 

Spanish game shows
Dating and relationship reality television series